Manfred Mohr (born June 8, 1938 in Pforzheim/Germany) is a German artist considered to be a pioneer in the field of digital art. He has lived and worked in New York since 1981.

Life and career
Mohr started his career as an action painter and jazz musician. He began using a computer in 1969 because of a growing interest in creating algorithmic art. He lived in Barcelona in 1962 and in Paris between 1963 and 1983.

His early computer works are algorithmic and based on his former drawings with a strong attitude on rhythm and repetition. In 1990 he was awarded the Prix Ars Electronica (Golden Nica) at Ars Electronica festival in Linz, Austria. He maintained an art studio in Paris from 1963 to 1983. Mohr attended Kunst + Werkschule in Pforzheim and École des Beaux-Arts in Paris.

In 1968 he co-founded the seminar "Art et Informatique" at the University of Vincennes and in May 1971 had a solo exhibit at  ARC - Musée d'Art Moderne de la Ville de Paris. Since then, that exhibition has become known historically as the first solo show in a museum of works entirely calculated and drawn by a digital computer.

Recent solo exhibitions of his work include Art Basel "Art Features" with bitforms gallery NY in Basel, DAM Gallery in Berlin, Mueller-Roth Gallery in Stuttgart, Carroll / Fletcher Gallery in London, bitforms gallery in New York City, Galerie Charlot in Paris, the Museum of Kulturspeicher in Würzburg, and Galerie Wack in Kaiserslautern.

Major retrospectives of his work include ZKM | Media Museum  in Karlsruhe in 2013, the Kunsthalle in Bremen in 2007, Joseph Albers Museum in Bottrop, Germany in 1998, and the Wilhelm-Hack-Museum in Ludwigshafen, Germany in 1987.

Mohr's work is collected by the Centre Pompidou in Paris, the Joseph Albers Museum, the Ludwig Museum in Cologne, the Museum for Concret Art in Ingolstadt, the Kunstmuseum Stuttgart, Musee d’Art Contemporain and Musée des Beaux-Arts in Montreal, the Stedelijk Museum in Amsterdam, Musée de l'Élysée in Switzerland, and many others. Mohr has had numerous solo exhibitions in both museums and galleries in New York, Zürich, Cologne, Paris, Amsterdam, Stuttgart, Berlin, Montreal, São Paulo, and Seoul. Additionally, he has participated in group exhibitions at the Leo Castelli Gallery and at the Museum of Modern Art in New York.

Mohr has received many awards including the 2013 ACM SIGGRAPH Distinguished Artist Award for Lifetime Achievement in Digital Art, 2006 (ddaa) Digital Art Award Cologne/Berlin, a fellowship from New York Foundation for the Arts in 1997, the 1990 Golden Nica  from Ars Electronica in Linz, the 1990 Camille Graeser Prize  in Zürich, and the 1973 Ljubljana Print Biennial. In 1994, the first comprehensive monograph on his work was published by Waser-Verlag in Zürich.

Studies, exhibitions, and prizes
 1957 - Kunst + Werkschule, Pforzheim (gold- and silversmith, painting); jazz musician (tenor-sax, oboe)
 1960 - Action painting
 1961 - Received school prize (art) of the City of Pforzheim
 1962 - Began the exclusive use of black and white as a means of visual and aesthetic expression
 1965 - Studied lithography at the Ecole des Beaux Arts, Paris; geometric experiments led to hard edge painting
 1968 - First one-man exhibition at the Daniel Templon Gallery, Paris; systematization of the picture content
 1969 - Publication of the visual book Artificiata I. First drawings with a computer.
 1971 - First one-man show of computer generated digital art in a museum, ARC, Museé d'Art Moderne de la Ville de Paris, Paris / France
 1972 - Sequential computer drawings were introduced; began to work on fixed structures: the cube
 1973 - Received awards at the World Print Competition-73, San Francisco, and the 10th Biennial in Ljubljana
 1977 - Began to work with the 4-D hypercube and graph-theory
 1980 - Workphase: divisibility, dissection of cube
 1982 - Quasi-organic growth programs on the cube
 1987 - First retrospective exhibition, Wilhelm-Hack-Museum, Ludwigshafen; renewed work on the 4-D hypercube; four-dimensional rotation as generator of signs
 1989 - Extended work to the 5-D and 6-D hypercube. Rotation as well as projection as generators of signs
 1990 - Received the Golden Nica at Ars Electronica in Linz and the Camille Graeser Prize in Zürich
 1991 - Workphase: laserglyphs, diagonal paths through 6-D hypercube are cut from steel plates with a laser
 1994 - The first comprehensive monograph on Manfred Mohr was published by Waser-Verlag, Zürich
 1997 - Was elected a member of the American Abstract Artists; received an Artists' Fellowship from New York Foundation for the Arts
 1998 - Started to use color (after using black and white for more than three decades) to show the complexity of the work through differentiation
 2002 - Designed and built small PCs to run his program "space.color" and since 2004 also the program "subsets". The resulting images were visualized on LCD flat panels in a slow, non-repetitive motion.
 2006 - Received the [ddaa] Digital Art Award (for digital pioneering- and original geometric research), Köl
 2013 - Received the ACM SIGGRAPH Distinguished Artist Award for Lifetime Achievement in Digital Art
 2013 - Honored with retrospective show The Algorithm of Manfred Mohr, 1963-now at ZKM - Media Museum, Karlsruhe
 2013 - Chosen as Featured Artist in a solo show at ArtBasel/Basel with bitforms gallery

Gallery

References

External links
Artist's website
The ddaa prize winner 2006
Winner Prix Ars Electronica 1990 - Golden Nica, computer graphics, Manfred Mohr
Show at "Truly Virtual Web Art Museum" of Dr. Rodney Chang (Pygoya)
Ein radikaler Rationalist - Manfred Mohr im Kunstforum
Kunsthalle Bremen - Manfred Mohr - broken symmetry
Kunstahalle Bremen Manfred Mohr - broken symmetry - press release
Siggraph 1998 - Pioneering Artists
New York Foundation of the Arts -  Manfred Mohr Artist's Fellowship 1997
Die Zeit 1996 - Manfred Mohr ist ein Purist unter den Computerkünstlern by Manfred Dworschak
 (complete reference homepage)
 List of works held by the Victoria and Albert Museum
 

German digital artists
1938 births
Living people
German contemporary artists